Karghond (also Romanized as Karqond, Korqand, Kurgūnd, and Korqond) is a village in Karghond Rural District, Nimbeluk District, Qaen County, South Khorasan Province, Iran. At the 2006 census, its population was 2,428, in 675 families.

References 

Populated places in Qaen County